Association Sportive et Culturelle Saloum is a Senegalese football club based in Kaolack.

Its uniform colors features a red-black striped t-shirt with red-edged black shorts and socks with red stripes on top used during home games and a white t-shirt with red sleeves and black rims and white for the rest of the clothing used during away and alternate games.

History
The club was founded in 1997 in the city of Kaolack after the merger of AS Kaolack and ASC Mbossé Kaolack.  The club is named after Saloum, the former kingdom once existed during the pre-colonial times.

Before the merger, ASC Mbossé Kaolack appeared in the national division in the early 1990s and participated until 1994.  that time, the club finished in the lower positions for some seasons until they were relegated in 1994.

The club first appeared in 2004 in the top division in Senegalese football and played up to the 2010 season and was relegated to the Ligue 2.  The club was in the last positions in the early season but reached 2nd in Group A in 2007 and in the final phase finished second behind Diaraf with 15 points.  The club was in the mid to low positions in the remaining three seasons and was finally relegated in 2010 after being 9th in Group B. Their home stadium is Stade Lamine Guèye.  Saloum has now been relegated into Nationale 1 in the 2015 season, the club finished 13th and were in the relegation zone.

The club appeared in the Senegalese Cup final in 2000 and was their only appearance.  Saloum lost to ASC Port Autonome 4-0.

Their first appearance in the League Cup was in 2009 and their final appearance was the 2015 edition.  In 2009, the club lost 3-0 to Casa Sports in the 1/8 final and in 2010, the club defeated US Gorée which made their first League Cup win, they lost their second match to AS Pikine.

As a second qualifier as second place in the final phase of the 2007 Division 1, the club entered the CAF Champions League for 2008 and the club only played in the preliminaries, the club lost to  Tunisia's Club Africain.  The club scored only a goal.

League and cup history

Performance in CAF competitions

National level

As Mbosse-Kaolack

As ASC Saloum

Statistics
Best position: Preliminary Round (continental)
Best position at cup competitions: Finalist (national)
Highest number of wins in a season: 12, in 2004
Highest number of goals in a season: 29, in 2004
Highest number of points in a season: 46, in 2004
Total matches played at the CAF Champions League: 2
Total number of goals scored at the CAF Champions League: 1
Highest number of goals conceded in a season: 36, in 2004

Current squad

Notable players
 Papy Mison Djilobodji
 Sergine Ibrahima Moreau

References

External links
ASC Saloum at Soccerway

Football clubs in Senegal
Football clubs in Serer country
1996 establishments in Senegal
Association football clubs established in 1996